Ervis Kraja (born 26 June 1983) is an Albanian football player who plays for Skënderbeu Korçë in the Albanian Superliga.

Kraja has played in Albania for Vllaznia Shkodër, Besa Kavajë, KS Besëlidhja. He also played abroad in Greece for Iraklis Thessaloniki F.C. and in the Ukraine for FC Zakarpattia Uzhhorod.

International career
Kraja has participated with the Albania national football team at the U-17, U-19 and U-21 levels, and has appeared in two matches with the senior side.

References

External links
 

1983 births
Living people
Footballers from Shkodër
Albanian footballers
Association football central defenders
Besëlidhja Lezhë players
KF Vllaznia Shkodër players
Besa Kavajë players
Iraklis Thessaloniki F.C. players
FC Hoverla Uzhhorod players
KF Skënderbeu Korçë players
KF Teuta Durrës players
FK Dinamo Tirana players
Kategoria Superiore players
Ukrainian Premier League players
Ukrainian First League players
Albanian expatriate footballers
Expatriate footballers in Greece
Albanian expatriate sportspeople in Greece
Expatriate footballers in Ukraine
Albanian expatriate sportspeople in Ukraine
Albanian football managers
KF Vllaznia Shkodër managers